Heliophanus aeneus is a jumping spider species in the genus Heliophanus.  It was first described by Carl Wilhelm Hahn in 1832 and is found in the Palearctic realm.

References

Salticidae
Spiders of Europe
Palearctic spiders
Spiders described in 1832
Taxa named by Carl Wilhelm Hahn